Math (or maths in some English-speaking countries) is an abbreviation of mathematics.

Math or Maths may also refer to:

Arts, entertainment and media

Fictional characters
Math, a character on the TV series Life Unexpected
Math fab Mathonwy, a king in Welsh mythology
Mathematical Anti Telharsic Harfatum Septomin, a topic on the TV series Look Around You

Music

Groups
MATH (band), an American band formed in the 1990s
Math, the original name of American rock band Mutemath

Songs
"Maths" (song), a 2012 single by Canadian producer deadmau5
"The Math", a song on Hilary Duff's 2003 album Metamorphosis

Computing and technology
, a tag used in MathML
, a module in the Python programming language

Places
 Math, Khyber Pakhtunkhwa, a village of the Khyber Pakhtunkhwa Province of Pakistan
Matha, Hindu monastic establishments, also known as "math" or "mutt"

Other uses 

 MATH, or Make America Think Harder, a slogan for Andrew Yang's 2020 presidential campaign
 Maths O. Sundqvist (1950–2012), a Swedish businessman

See also
Cmath (disambiguation)
Mathematica (disambiguation)
Mathematics (disambiguation)